Birkholz may refer to:
 Birkholz, village and a former municipality in the district of Stendal, in Saxony-Anhalt, Germany

People with the name
 Jean-Marc Birkholz (1974), German actor
 Patricia L. Birkholz (1944–2018), Michigan politician